Guowang Miao is an associate professor at KTH Royal Institute of Technology, Sweden, working on design and optimization of wireless communications and networking and the author of Fundamentals of Mobile Data Networks and Energy and Spectrum Efficient Wireless Network Design.

Education
Guowang Miao received his bachelor's degree from Tsinghua University and his master's degree and Ph.D. from Georgia Institute of Technology, Atlanta.

Career
Guowang Miao's initial career saw work at Intel Labs and Samsung Research America.

He won an Individual Gold Award from Samsung Telecom America, in 2011, for his work on LTE-A standardization.

In 2012, he joined the KTH Royal Institute of Technology as an assistant professor. In 2015, he became an associate professor at the same institute, where he also published above 80 research papers, some of which are Essential Science Indicators (ESI) highly cited with several of them patented. He also served as a technical program committee member for international conferences and also serves on the editorial board of some international journals.

Publications

Books
Energy and Spectrum Efficient Wireless Network Design.
Graduate textbook: Fundamentals of Mobile Data Networks.

Patents
Probabilistic interference mitigation for wireless cellular networks - US 8798653 B2.
Apparatus and method for channel measurement in radio link monitoring in a wireless network - US 8755753 B2.
Methods and apparatus for enabling interference coordination in heterogeneous networks - US 8600393 B2.
Energy efficient link adaptation and resource allocation for wireless OFDMA systems - US 7782829 B2.
Apparatus and method for supporting range expansion in a wireless network, EP 2601806 A2.
Apparatus and method for primary uplink shared channel hopping in a wireless network, EP2638675A2.

References

21st-century Swedish physicists
Tsinghua University alumni
Chinese emigrants to Sweden
Academic staff of the KTH Royal Institute of Technology
Georgia Tech alumni